The boat-tailed grackle (Quiscalus major) is a passerine bird of the family Icteridae found as a permanent resident on the coasts of the Southeastern United States.

Habitat
The boat-tailed grackle is found in coastal saltwater marshes and, in Florida, also on inland waters. Boat-tailed grackles have established significant populations in several United States Gulf Coast cities and towns, where they can be found foraging in trash bins, dumpsters, and parking lots.

Breeding
The nest is a well-concealed cup in trees or shrubs near water; three to five eggs are laid.

Description
Adult males have entirely iridescent black plumage, a long dark bill, a pale yellowish or brown iris, and a long keel-shaped tail. She is also distinguished by her shorter tail and tawny-brown coloration, which covers the body apart from the darker wings and tail. In standard measurements, this species measures  along the wing bone,  in tail length,  along the culmen, and  along the tarsus. On average, the boat-tailed grackle weighs about 10% more than the closely related great-tailed grackle, although the male great-tailed grackle has an even longer tail.

Young males are black but lack the adult's iridescence. Immature females are duller versions of the adult female and have blotches or spots on the breast. The eye color of the boat-tailed grackle varies with range. Gulf Coast and inland birds have dark eyes, whereas Atlantic birds have pale eyes.

Taxonomy
The boat-tailed grackle was first described by French naturalist Louis Jean Pierre Vieillot in 1819. Its specific epithet major means "larger" in Latin. Despite its restricted range, there are four subspecies of the boat-tailed grackle, differing in size and iris color. The boat-tailed grackle was once considered the same species as the great-tailed grackle. The great-tailed species is generally quite similar of slightly smaller body size but has a longer tail and lacks this species' distinct domed head shape. The common grackle, with which the boat-tailed species often overlaps along the Atlantic coastline, is noticeably smaller and shorter-tailed, as well as lacking the domed head shape.

Diet
They forage on the ground, in shallow water, or in shrubs; they will steal food from other birds. They are omnivorous, eating insects, minnows, frogs, eggs, berries, seeds, grain, and even small birds.

Call
Its song is a harsh jeeb, and it has a variety of typically grackle-like chatters and squeaks.

Gallery

References

External links

 Boat-tailed grackle at Florida Bird Sounds (Florida Museum of Natural History)
 
 
 
 
 
 
 

boat-tailed grackle
Native birds of the Southeastern United States
Endemic birds of the Eastern United States
boat-tailed grackle
boat-tailed grackle